Nilokheri railway station is a station on the Delhi–Kalka line. It is located in the Indian state of Haryana. It serves Nilokheri and surrounding area

The railway station
It was allotted the railway code of NLKR under the jurisdiction of Delhi railway division.

History

The Delhi–Ambala–Kalka line was opened in 1891.

References

Karnal
Delhi railway division
Nilokheri
Railway stations in Haryana